Frederick Fields may refer to:

Freddie Fields (1923–2007), American theatrical agent and film director
Fred Fields, artist

See also
Frederick Field (disambiguation)